Sassofortino is a village in Tuscany, central Italy,  administratively a frazione of the comune of Roccastrada, province of Grosseto. At the time of the 2001 census its population amounted to 815.

Sassofortino is a hilly medieval village situated about 33 km from Grosseto and 8 km from Roccastrada.

Main sights 
 San Michele Arcangelo (14th century), main parish church of the village. It was restructured in 1893.
 Castle of Sassoforte, an 11th-century fortress, now in ruins.

References

Sources 
 Aldo Mazzolai, Guida della Maremma. Percorsi tra arte e natura, Le Lettere, Florence, 1997.
 Giuseppe Guerrini, Torri e castelli della Provincia di Grosseto, Nuova Immagine Editrice, Siena, 1999.

See also 
 Montemassi
 Piloni
 Ribolla
 Roccatederighi
 Sticciano
 Torniella

Frazioni of Roccastrada